Andis Juška and Alexandre Kudryavtsev were the defending champions, but decided to not participate this year.
1st seeds Treat Conrad Huey and Purav Raja won this tournament, by defeating Hiroki Kondo and Tasuku Iwami in the final.

Seeds

Draw

Draw

External links
 Main Draw

Doubles
2010 Men's Doubles